

The R336 road is a regional road in County Galway in Ireland which connects the N59 road at Leenaun beside Killary Harbour – via Inverin – to the N6 and N83 in Galway,  to the southeast (map). 

On leaving the fjord in Killary Harbour at Leenaun, the road travels south between the Maumturk and Partry mountain ranges in Joyce Country and passes through the Irish speaking Gaeltacht district of Connemara, and the villages and towns of Maum (where it meets the R345 road), Maam Cross (where it crosses the N59 again), Screeb (where it meets the R340 road), Kinvara, and Costelloe (where it meets the R343 road), and the R372 road. The R336 then turns east and travels along the shore of Galway Bay, passing through Inverin, Spiddal, Furbo, Barna, Salthill, and Galway, where it joins the N6 and N83 roads.

The government legislation that defines the R336, the Roads Act 1993 (Classification of Regional Roads) Order 2012 (Statutory Instrument 54 of 2012), provides the following official description:

R336: Leenaun — An Teach Dóite — An Spidéal, County Galway — Galway

Between its junction with N59 at Leenaun in the county of Galway and its junction with N6 at Bothan na dTreabh in the city of Galway via Muintir Eoghain Thior, An Mám, Tír na Cille Theas, An Teach Dóite, Dóire Bhanbh, Camas Íochtair, Dóire an Fhéich, Casla, Na Doiriú Theas, Indreabhán, An Spidéal, Bearna and Knockaunacarragh in the county of Galway: Bóthar Bhearna, Knocknacarragh Cross, Salthill Road Upper, Seapoint Promenade, Doctor Colohan Road, Whitestrand Road, Father Griffin Road, Wolfe Tone Bridge, Flood Street, New Dock Street, Merchants Road, (and via Queen Street and Dock Road), Victoria Place, Eyre Square South, Eyre Square East, Prospect Hill (and via Bothar Uí Eithir and Forster Street), Bohermore, Cemetery Cross and Tuam Road in the city of Galway.

Proposed improvement

The plan considers the road a "a major obstacle to developing the South Connemara region and economy". The plan calls for a major realignment of the road, replacing most of the present route.

See also
Roads in Ireland
National primary road
National secondary road

References

External links
 Description of the R336 and sights along the route

Regional roads in the Republic of Ireland
Roads in County Galway